The following lists events that happened during the year 1996 in Bosnia and Herzegovina.

Incumbents
Presidency:
Alija Izetbegović 
Krešimir Zubak 
Momčilo Krajišnik
Prime Minister: Haris Silajdžić (until January 30), Hasan Muratović (starting January 30)

Events

September
 September 14 - 1996 Bosnian general election took place.

 
Years of the 20th century in Bosnia and Herzegovina
1990s in Bosnia and Herzegovina
Bosnia and Herzegovina
Bosnia and Herzegovina